Emerson Barbosa Rodrigues dos Santos (born 18 August 1998), simply known as Emerson, is a Brazilian footballer who plays for Ferroviário-CE as a left back.

Club career
Born in Cacoal, Rondônia, Emerson joined Santos' youth setup in 2016, from Flamengo. On 8 November of that year, he signed his first professional contract until 2019.

On 1 December 2017, as Caju, Jean Mota and Orinho were all injured, Emerson was called up to train with the first team by manager Elano. He was included in the 21-man list for the match against Avaí the following day.

Emerson made his first team – and Série A debut on 3 December 2017, coming on as a substitute for Emiliano Vecchio in a 1–1 home draw against the Santa Catarina-based club. For the 2018 campaign, he only featured with the under-23 squad.

On 17 December 2018, Emerson was presented at Tupi. The following 27 February, however, he was announced at CRAC after cutting ties with his previous club, but only played one match for the latter before moving to Vitória-ES in May.

Career statistics

References

External links
Santos FC profile 

1998 births
Living people
Sportspeople from Rondônia
Brazilian footballers
Association football defenders
Campeonato Brasileiro Série A players
Campeonato Brasileiro Série D players
Santos FC players
Tupi Football Club players
Clube Recreativo e Atlético Catalano players
Vitória Futebol Clube (ES) players
Ferroviário Atlético Clube (CE) players